Mauritius competed in the 2010 Commonwealth Games held in Delhi, India, from 3 to 14 October 2010.

Medals

Medalists

Athletics

Wednesday 6 October. 100m Men's Round 1 Heat 1. Jean Baptiste Joel Brasse: 7th 10.710s 

Wednesday 6 October. 100m Men's Round 1 Heat 5. Ahmed Ondimba Bongo: Disqualified due to false start

Thursday 7 October. 100m Women – Semifinal 1. Mary Jane Vincent. Lane 8. Disqualified due to false start.

Thursday 7 October. Men's Decathlon 100m – Heat 1. Patrick Guillaume Llyod Thierry: 7th 734 points

Thursday 7 October. Men's Decathlon Shot Put. Patrick Guillaume Llyod Thierry: 9th 693 points

Thursday 7 October. Men's Decathlon 400m – Heat 1. Patrick Guillaume Llyod Thierry: 7th 729 points

Thursday 7 October. Men's 400m – Heat 6. Jean Fernando Augustin: 5th 48.430s

Thursday 7 October. Men's 400m – Heat 3. Jean Francois Degrace: 4th 47.210s

Boxing

Tuesday 5 October. Light Welterweight 64 kg. Bout 15 – Preliminary: Louis Colin (Mri) bt Chris Jenkins (Wal) 

Tuesday 5 October. Flyweight 52 kg. Bout 3 – Preliminary: Gilbert Bactora (Mri) bt Samarasekara Dissanayake (Sri)

Wednesday 6 October. Light Weight (60 kg) Men's Qualification Bout 42 – Qualification Round: Alex Rynn (Can) bt Jean Colin (Mri)

Wednesday 6 October. Welter Weight (69 kg) Men's Qualification Bout 46 – Qualification Round: Joseph St Pierre (Mri) bt Freddie Evans (Wal)

Thursday 7 October. Men's Light Fly 46–49 kg Bout 62 – Preliminary: Jason Lavigilante (Mri) bt Christopher Katanga (Zam)

Swimming

Monday 4 October. 200m Freestyle – Heat 1. Olivia De Maroussem: 2nd 02:20.320 

Tuesday 5 October. 100m Freestyle – Heat 3. Olivia De Maroussem: 6th 01:03.100

Tuesday 5 October. 50m Butterfly – Heat 3. Jean Gregoire: 8th 28.480

Wednesday 6 October. 100m Freestyle Heat 3 – Qualification Round. Jean Gregoire: 8th 56.940 

Thursday 7 October. 50m Freestyle – Heat 4. Olivia De Maroussem: 8th 28.540s

Tennis

Tuesday 5 October. Women's Singles 7 – 1st rd: Sohinee Ghosh (Mri) bt Stacey Roheman (Lca)

Tuesday 5 October. Men's Singles 10 – 1st rd: Harshana Godamanna (Sri) bt Kamil Patel (Mri)

Wednesday 6 October. Women's Singles – 2nd rd: Anna Smith (Eng) bt Sohinee Ghosh (Mri)

Weightlifting

Monday 4 October. 56 kg – Final. Marc Coret: 8th 210 points

See also
 2010 Commonwealth Games

References

External links
  Times of India
  List of participating Mauritian athletes

Com
Nations at the 2010 Commonwealth Games
2010